The FM/TV Mast Wręczyca Wielka/Klepaczka is a 340 metre tall guyed mast for FM and TV situated at Klepaczka, Kłobuck County, Silesian Voivodeship in Poland.
The FM/TV Mast Wręczyca Wielka/Klepaczka, which was built in 1997, is since the collapse of the Warsaw radio mast the fifth tallest structure in Poland.
The site is also known as Wręczyca Transmitter.

Transmitted programs

FM radio

Digital television MPEG-4

See also

 List of masts

References

External links
 EmiTel
 Mast in RadioPolska
 DVB-T in Silesia
 Coverage map
 
 

Radio masts and towers in Poland
Kłobuck County
Buildings and structures in Silesian Voivodeship
1997 establishments in Poland
Towers completed in 1997